The 1923 Niagara vs. Colgate football game was a college football game between the Niagara Purple Eagles and the Colgate Maroon played on October 6, 1923. The game was played at Whitnall Field in Hamilton Village, New York. The game is known for the Niagara team refusing to tackle their opponents during play and intentionally allowing them to score multiple times.

Coach Pete Dwyer of Niagara wanted to play four quarters of eight minutes in length rather than the standard 15-minute quarters, an agreement reached between the schools at an earlier date. Opposing coach Dick Harlow wanted nothing to do with the rule change and insisted on the standard 15 minutes. In protest, the players of Niagara refused to tackle their opponents. Dwyer told his team "I will dismiss from the squad any man who makes a tackle. I refuse to ruin you as a football team by playing 60 minutes against a team like that, even if they score 1,000 points." Colgate scored three touchdowns in the first two minutes before Harlow agreed to the 8 minute quarters and resumed the game.

Colgate's star halfback, Ed Tryon, scored a team record seven touchdowns in the game. His 42 total points also remain a Colgate record for a single game.

References

1923 college football season
vs. Niagara 1923
vs. Colgate 1923
1923 in sports in New York (state)
October 1923 sports events